Basin Bridge Gas Turbine Power Station is a state-owned gas fuel-based power plant located in Basin Bridge, Chennai. It has a capacity of 120 MW and is operated by the Tamil Nadu State Electricity Board.

History
The plant was constructed as a 120-MW gas turbine power plant with four units, each with a capacity of 30 MW, the plant with all the four units was commissioned in February–March 1996. The power station was built at a cost of about  400 crores. The first two units were supplied by Overseas Economic Co-operative Fund, Japan, while the third and fourth units were from BHEL.

The plant is run and maintained by the Tamil Nadu Electricity Board (TNEB) and is normally used during peak hours (06:00 to 09:00 hours and 18:00 to 21:00 hours).

Operations
The units can be operated by various fuels, such as naphtha and natural gas (dual-fuel system), and the starting fuel used is high-speed diesel (HSD). However, due to non-availability of natural gas/LNG in Chennai, the units are operated on naphtha fuel. From 20 January 2010, the units are run also as synchronous condenser to supply reactive power to the grid for better voltage profile and system stability. The plant is operated in open cycle mode. The cost of generation of power at the plant was  9.72 per unit.

Capacity

Incidents
On 6 March 2000, a fire broke out at around 21:00 hours at Unit IV of the power station, which was put out by more than 20 fire tenders and Metrowater tankers. Initially, smoke emanated from the reduction gear compartment used to reduce the speed of the machine. At the time of the event, three of the four units were functioning, generating 90 MW of power. All the units were switched off as a precautionary measure until the fire was put out. There was neither any causality nor any loss of power generation.

See also
 List of power stations in India

References

External links
Page in Global Energy Observatory

Companies based in Chennai
Power plants in Chennai
Natural gas-fired power stations in Tamil Nadu
1996 establishments in Tamil Nadu
Energy infrastructure completed in 1996